Nils Petersen (born 6 December 1988) is a German professional footballer who plays as a forward for Bundesliga club SC Freiburg and the Germany national team. He appeared in the 2016 Summer Olympics and remains the first and only German footballer who has scored five goals in a single game with the national team.

Youth
Petersen spent his early youth developing at hometown club FC Einheit in Wernigerode and afterward continued his development at VfB Germania in Halberstadt. Later he attended the Sport School Jena, playing in their youth team, eventually leaving during the summer of 2007.

Club career

Carl Zeiss Jena
In February 2005, Carl Zeiss Jena signed Petersen to a youth contract, before promoting him to the First Team in January 2007. Before promotion to the first team, Petersen had already gained experience playing with the reserves playing in the Oberliga. Petersen made his professional debut on 4 February 2007 (20th matchday), in a 1–0 loss in an away match against 1. FC Köln. He entered the match in the 89th minute as a substitute for Mohammed El Berkani.

In future matches, he would serve as a "Super-Sub" coming off the bench to score decisive goals against Alemannia Aachen, Erzgebirge Aue, 1. FC Kaiserslautern, and FC Augsburg.

Energie Cottbus
On 6 January 2009, Petersen switched to Energie Cottbus. In his first season with the club, he made an appearance in the Bundesliga and the relegation playoff. He premiered for Cottbus on the final match-day of the season in a 3–0 home victory over Bayer Leverkusen, on 23 May 2009. Cottbus, finishing 16th in their Bundesliga campaign, would go on to lose in the relegation/promotion playoff against 2nd division 1. FC Nürnberg, resulting in Cottbus' relegation to 2. Bundesliga. During the first half of the 2009–10 season, Petersen rarely saw playing time for Cottbus. After the winter break, his playing time increased as he was able to score nine goals in 14 appearances, securing his place in the starting line-up.

During the 2010–11 campaign, Petersen would become the 2. Bundesliga top goalscorer, notching 25 goals in 33 appearances, helping Cottbus to a mid-table finish. In February 2011, despite interest from various Bundesliga clubs, he decided to extend his existing contract by two years until June 2014.

Bayern Munich
On 19 May 2011, FC Bayern Munich reported the signing of Petersen to a three-year contract until 30 June 2014. Nils Petersen scored his first hat-trick (three goals) in the first ever game he played for FC Bayern Munich against a Trentino Selection. On 10 September 2011, having been on for just 17 minutes, Petersen came close twice, and finally scored his first Bundesliga goal against Freiburg.

Werder Bremen

On 29 June 2012, SV Werder Bremen agreed to a one-year loan deal with Bayern Munich for Petersen. After a successful season on loan at Werder, it was announced on 23 May 2013 that he had penned a four-year contract with the club for an undisclosed fee.

SC Freiburg

After having only earned seven caps and most of them as a substitute during the first half of the 2014–15 season, Petersen was loaned to SC Freiburg for the second leg of the campaign. On 31 January 2015, in his league debut versus Eintracht Frankfurt, he scored a hat-trick, despite just coming on as a substitute for the second half, ultimately helping his team turning a 0–1 deficit into a 4–1 victory. He subsequently made appearances on matchdays 19 and 20. Christian Streich, Freiburg's head coach, stated that Petersen was "an option for the squad." He finished the 2014–15 season by scoring nine goals in 12 matches for Freiburg.

On 28 June 2015, Petersen joined newly relegated Freiburg on a permanent deal, for an undisclosed fee. On 27 July 2015, he marked his season debut by scoring a hat-trick in a 6–3 victory over 1. FC Nürnberg. On 9 August 2015, he continued his good form by scoring his second hat-trick in three games, in a 5–0 win at fifth-tier side HSV Barmbek-Uhlenhorst in the first round of the DFB-Pokal. He finished the 2015–16 season by scoring 25 goals in 34 matches.

Petersen made his 100th top flight appearance on 29 October 2016 by coming on in the second half of the 3–1 away win against his former side Werder Bremen. He scored his first Bundesliga hat-trick later on 10 December 2017, including two penalties in the injury time, in the 4–3 win at 1. FC Köln.

In the 2017–18 season, Petersen was the top scoring German in the Bundesliga with 15 goals, finishing second to only Robert Lewandowski of Bayern Munich. On 19 January 2019, he scored his 38th league goal for Freiburg, breaking the club's all-time Bundesliga goalscoring record previously held by Papiss Cissé.

International career

Petersen was a member of the Germany U19, scoring a goal against Russia during the UEFA U-19 European Championship and the Germany U20, before being called up on 6 August 2009 for the German U21.

Petersen was part of Germany Olympic Squad for Rio's Olympic along with Lars and Sven Bender as one of three allowed players over the age of 23. On 4 August 2016, he came on as a substitute in the 84th minute for Davie Selke in a 2–2 draw. Three days later, in the 83rd minute, he was again substituted on for Selke. On 10 August 2016, he started and scored five goals in a 10–0 win against Fiji. On 13 August 2016, against Portugal, he again replaced Selke, in the 78th minute. On 17 August 2016, in the semi-final against Nigeria, Petersen came on for Max Meyer in the 84th minute and scored his sixth goal of the tournament five minutes later. On 20 August 2016, Petersen entered the pitch as a 76th-minute substitute for Selke in the Gold medal match. He was the only player who failed to score in the shootout in the gold medal match, and Germany won the silver medal.

On 15 May 2018, he was named in Germany's provisional 2018 FIFA World Cup squad. Petersen was then handed his first cap in a friendly versus Austria on 2 June in preparation for the World Cup, but was left off of Löw's final squad for the tournament.

Career statistics

Club

International

Honours
Germany
Summer Olympic Games silver medalist: 2016

References

External links

1988 births
Living people
People from Wernigerode
Footballers from Saxony-Anhalt
German footballers
Germany international footballers
Germany under-21 international footballers
Germany youth international footballers
Association football forwards
Bundesliga players
2. Bundesliga players
3. Liga players
Regionalliga players
Oberliga (football) players
VfB Germania Halberstadt players
FC Carl Zeiss Jena players
FC Energie Cottbus players
FC Energie Cottbus II players
FC Bayern Munich footballers
FC Bayern Munich II players
SV Werder Bremen players
SC Freiburg players
Footballers at the 2016 Summer Olympics
Olympic footballers of Germany
Olympic silver medalists for Germany
Medalists at the 2016 Summer Olympics
Olympic medalists in football